The 25th Filmfare Awards were held in 1978.

Amar Akbar Anthony and Hum Kisise Kum Naheen led the ceremony with 7 nominations each, followed by Gharaonda and Swami with 6 nominations each.

Amar Akbar Anthony, Hum Kisise Kum Naheen and Swami won 3 awards each, thus becoming the most-awarded films at the ceremony.

Shyam Benegal's Bhumika won Best Film, starting a run where 3 films by Shyam Benegal won Best Film in 5 years. 

Sanjeev Kumar received dual nominations for Best Actor for his performances in Yehi Hai Zindagi and Zindagi, but lost to Amitabh Bachchan, who himself received dual nominations in the category for his performances in Adalat and Amar Akbar Anthony, winning for the latter, his first win in the category.

Shriram Lagoo also received dual nominations for Best Supporting Actor for his performances in Gharaonda and Kinara, winning for the former.

Main awards

Best Film
 Bhumika 
Amar Akbar Anthony
Gharaonda
Manthan
Swami

Best Director
 Basu Chatterjee – Swami 
Asrani – Chala Murari Hero Banne
Bhimsain – Gharaonda
Gulzar – Kinara
Manmohan Desai – Amar Akbar Anthony

Best Actor
 Amitabh Bachchan – Amar Akbar Anthony 
Amitabh Bachchan – Adalat
Sanjeev Kumar – Yehi Hai Zindagi
Sanjeev Kumar – Zindagi
Vinod Khanna – Shaque

Best Actress
 Shabana Azmi – Swami 
Hema Malini – Kinara
Raakhee – Doosra Aadmi
Smita Patil – Bhumika
Zarina Wahab – Gharaonda

Best Supporting Actor
 Shreeram Lagoo – Gharaonda 
Shreeram Lagoo – Kinara
Tariq – Hum Kisise Kum Naheen
Vikram – Aadmi Sadak Ka
Vinod Mehra – Anurodh

Best Supporting Actress
 Asha Sachdev – Priyatama 
Aruna Irani – Khoon Pasina
Farida Jalal – Shaque
Nazneen – Dildaar
Raakhee – Doosra Aadmi

Best Comic Actor
 Paintal – Chala Murari Hero Banne 
Deven Verma – Doosra Aadmi
Keshto Mukherjee – Chacha Bhatija
Manik Dutt – Safed Jhoot
Mukri – Tyaag

Best Story
 Swami – Sarat Chandra Chattopadhyay 
Chala Murari Hero Banne – Asrani
Doosra Aadmi – Raju Saigal
Gharaonda – Shankar Shesh
Kinara – Bhusan Bangali

Best Screenplay
 Dulhan Wohi Jo Piya Man Bhaye – Lekh Tandon, Vrajendra Gaur and Madhusudan Kalekar

Best Dialogue
 Dulhan Wohi Jo Piya Man Bhaye – Vrajendra Gaur

Best Music Director 
 Amar Akbar Anthony – Laxmikant–Pyarelal 
Alaap – Jaidev
Hum Kisise Kum Naheen – R.D. Burman
Kinara – R.D. Burman
Swami – Rajesh Roshan

Best Lyricist
 Gharaonda – Gulzar for Do Deewana Sheher Main 
Amar Akbar Anthony – Anand Bakshi for Parda Hai Parda
Hum Kisise Kum Naheen – Majrooh Sultanpuri for Kya Hua Tera Wada
Kinara – Gulzar for Naam Gum Jaayega
Manthan – Priti Sagar for Mero Gaam Katha Parey

Best Playback Singer, Male
 Hum Kisise Kum Naheen – Mohammad Rafi for Kya Hua Tera Wada 
Amar Akbar Anthony – Mohammad Rafi for Parda Hai Parda
Anurodh – Kishore Kumar for Aap Ke Anurodh
Mukti – Mukesh for Suhaani Chandni
Swami – K.J. Yesudas  for Aaye Na Balam

Best Playback Singer, Female
 Manthan – Priti Sagar for Mero Gaam Katha Parey 
Hum Kisise Kum Naheen – Sushma Shrestha for Kya Hua Tera Wada
Inkaar – Usha Mangeshkar for O Mungada Mungada
Taxi Taxie – Asha Bhosle for Laayi Kahaan Hai Zindagi

Best Art Direction
 Hum Kisise Kum Naheen  – Shanti Das

Best Cinematography
 Hum Kisise Kum Naheen  – Munir Khan

Best Editing
 Amar Akbar Anthony  – Kamlakar Karkhanis

Best Sound
 Agent Vinod  – Dinshaw Billmoria

Critics' Awards

Best Film
 Shatranj Ke Khiladi

Best Documentary
 Transformations

Biggest Winners
 Swami – 3/6
 Amar Akbar Anthony – 3/7
 Hum Kisise Kum Naheen – 3/7
 Dulhan Wohi Jo Piya Man Bhaye – 2/2
 Gharaonda – 2/6

See also
27th Filmfare Awards
 26th Filmfare Awards
 Filmfare Awards

References

Filmfare Awards
Filmfare
1978 in Indian cinema